Yu Myeong-ja (born 2 April 1943) is a South Korean gymnast. She competed in five events at the 1960 Summer Olympics.

References

External links
 

1943 births
Living people
South Korean female artistic gymnasts
Olympic gymnasts of South Korea
Gymnasts at the 1960 Summer Olympics
Sportspeople from South Chungcheong Province
20th-century South Korean women